James E. Snyder (June 29, 1919 – April 27, 1994) was a college basketball head coach and former player.  He attended Ohio University where he played basketball under head coach Dutch Trautwein.  He was an assistant coach under Trautwein for three seasons beginning in 1946.  After Trautwein's retirement he became the head coach of the Ohio Bobcats men's basketball team where he remained for 26 years (1949–1974). He amassed 20 winning seasons and led his teams to 7 NCAA tournament appearances (1960, 1961, 1964, 1965, 1970, 1972, and 1974) and one National Invitation Tournament appearance (1969). Snyder's teams compiled a 355-255 record, good for a .581 winning percentage.  He is the all time leader in coaching wins at Ohio. He was also an Ohio graduate (Class of 1941), and was a football and basketball star as an undergraduate in the late 1930s and early 1940s.  He played for and was an assistant under Dutch Trautwein. He was inducted the Ohio Athletics Hall of Fame in 1967 and the Ohio Basketball Hall of Fame in 2007. One of his most memorable wins came against the University of Kentucky in the 1964 NCAA tournament, advancing the Ohio Bobcats to the Elite 8. One interesting aspect of this game was that Ohio had an integrated team while Kentucky had one of its last all white teams.  Snyder was widely admired throughout the college basketball coaching fraternity as being a coach with great integrity and an engaging personality; he was often referred to as "Gentleman Jim." When he retired he was replaced by his long time assistant Dale Bandy.

Head coaching record

Source

References

1919 births
1994 deaths
American men's basketball coaches
American men's basketball players
Basketball coaches from Ohio
Basketball players from Canton, Ohio
Ohio Bobcats football players
Ohio Bobcats men's basketball coaches
Ohio Bobcats men's basketball players
Ohio University alumni
People from Athens County, Ohio
Sportspeople from Canton, Ohio